Ettore Recagni (6 November 1937 – 2 November 2020) was an Italian football manager and player.

References

1937 births
2020 deaths
People from Lodi, Lombardy
Serie A players
Serie B players
Serie C players
Serie D players
S.S. Lazio players
U.S. Alessandria Calcio 1912 players
Italian football managers
Association football forwards
Italian footballers
Reggina 1914 managers
Italy women's national football team managers